Woodbury Friends' Meetinghouse is a historic Quaker meeting house in Woodbury in Gloucester County, New Jersey.

It was built in 1715 and added to the National Register of Historic Places in 1973.

References

See also
List of the oldest buildings in New Jersey

1715 establishments in the Thirteen Colonies
18th-century Quaker meeting houses
Churches completed in 1715
Churches in Gloucester County, New Jersey
Churches on the National Register of Historic Places in New Jersey
National Register of Historic Places in Gloucester County, New Jersey
New Jersey Register of Historic Places
Quaker meeting houses in New Jersey
Woodbury, New Jersey